Australia national soccer team may refer to:

 Australia men's national soccer team
 Australia men's national under-23 soccer team
 Australia men's national under-20 soccer team
 Australia men's national under-17 soccer team
 Australia men's national soccer B team
 Australia women's national soccer team
 Australia women's national under-23 soccer team
 Australia women's national under-20 soccer team
 Australia women's national under-17 soccer team

See also
 Australia national beach soccer team
 Australia national football team (disambiguation)
 Soccer in Australia